Marmet (pronounced mar-MET) is a city in Kanawha County, West Virginia, United States, along the Kanawha River. The population was 1,501 at the 2020 census.

The community was re-named in 1900 after the local Marmet Coal Company, which had the name of its proprietors Edwin and William Marmet. The town name was changed from Brownsville. The town name prior to 1829 was Elizaville that was founded in 1780 by Leonard Morris.

Geography
Marmet is located at  (38.245148, -81.567510).

Demographics

2010 census
As of the census of 2010, there were 1,503 people, 616 households, and 397 families living in the city. The racial makeup of the city was 96.5% White, 1.6% African American, 0.2% Native American, 0.2% Asian, and 1.5% from two or more races. Hispanic or Latino of any race were 0.3% of the population.

There were 616 households, of which 26.3% had children under the age of 18 living with them, 42.2% were married couples living together, 15.7% had a female householder with no husband present, 6.5% had a male householder with no wife present, and 35.6% were non-families. 30.7% of all households were made up of individuals, and 13.6% had someone living alone who was 65 years of age or older. The average household size was 2.29 and the average family size was 2.83.

The median age in the city was 46.2 years. 18.5% of residents were under the age of 18; 9.4% were between the ages of 18 and 24; 20.6% were from 25 to 44; 28.7% were from 45 to 64; and 23.1% were 65 years of age or older. The gender makeup of the city was 43.5% male and 56.5% female.

Battle of Blair Mountain
In August of 1921, thousands of pro-union coal miners organized in Marmet and marched 60 miles to Mingo County through Boone County and then into Logan before entering into Mingo. The aim was an attempt to free striking miners who had been arrested after the governor declared martial law. This confrontation between armed miners’ and the coal companies' army constituted the largest pitched battle in the history of the labor movement in the United States and became the largest insurrection on U.S. soil since the American Civil War. The battle only ended after President Harding called in the army to suppress the uprising. Once the military intervened, the miners laid down their weapons and the fighting ended.

References

Cities in West Virginia
Cities in Kanawha County, West Virginia
Populated places on the Kanawha River
Charleston, West Virginia metropolitan area